The 2018–19 Little Rock Trojans women's basketball team represents the University of Arkansas at Little Rock during the 2018–19 NCAA Division I women's basketball season. The Trojans, led by sixteenth year head coach Joe Foley, play their home games at the Jack Stephens Center and were members of the Sun Belt Conference. They finished the season 21–11, 15–3 in Sun Belt play to win the share the Sun Belt regular season title with Texas–Arlington and won the Sun Belt tournament title to earn an automatic trip to the NCAA women's tournament where they lost in the first round to Gonzaga.

Roster

Schedule

 
|-
!colspan=9 style=| Non-conference regular season

|-
!colspan=9 style=| Sun Belt Conference regular season

|-
!colspan=9 style=| Sun Belt Women's Tournament

|-
!colspan=9 style=| NCAA Women's Tournament

Rankings
2018–19 NCAA Division I women's basketball rankings

See also
 2018–19 Little Rock Trojans men's basketball team

References

Little Rock Trojans women's basketball seasons
Little Rock
Little Rock